The 9th Mechanized Brigade "Mărășești" (Brigada 9 Mecanizată "Mărășești") is a mechanized infantry brigade of the Romanian Land Forces.

History 
The unit was initially formed in 1879, after the Romanian War of Independence, as Divizia Activă de Dobrogea (Dobruja Active Division). In 1903 it was renamed to 9th Infantry Division, designation under which it participated in both world wars. In World War I it fought during the Battle of Mărășești where it defended the most difficult sector, being under constant attacks for two weeks. For its heroic actions in this battle, the 9th Infantry Division received the honorific name "Mărășești". In World War II, the division fought on both the Eastern Front, where it took part in the Battle of Stalingrad, and on the Western Front, participating in the liberation of Hungary and Czechoslovakia.

After World War II, the division went through some changes becoming the IXth Army Corps and eventually the 9th Mechanized Division before being deactivated. Vasile Milea commanded the division in 1957-58.

In 2004 the 34th Mechanized "Vasile Lupu" brigade was dissolved, with the remaining units passing to the Light Infantry Brigade (Brigada de Infanterie Ușoară) headquartered at Clinceni.  The land formerly occupied by the headquarters of the 34th Mechanized was given to the United States Army for a new base near the Mihail Kogălniceanu airport. In accordance with the transformation strategy of the Romanian Army, the 34th was reactivated on 1 October 2009 as 9th Mechanized Brigade "Mărășești", taking over control of all units in Dobruja from the former 34th Mechanized Brigade; two new subunits were also created at this time: the 911 Infantry and 912 Tank Battalion, the latter equipped with T-55 tanks and Flakpanzer Gepard.

Organization 2020 
 9th Mechanized Brigade "Mărășești", in Constanța
 912th Tank Battalion "Scythia Minor", in Murfatlar
 341st Mechanized Infantry Battalion "Constanța" , in Topraisar
 911th Mechanized Infantry Battalion "Capidava", in Medgidia
 345th Artillery Battalion "Tomis", in Medgidia
 348th Anti-aircraft Defense Battalion "Dobrogea", in Murfatlar
 168th Logistic Support Battalion "Pontus Euxinus", in Constanța

341st Infantry Battalion 

The 341st Infantry Battalion, nicknamed "White Sharks", is the most experienced unit of the new brigade, with numerous international deployments, including Kosovo, Afghanistan, and Iraq. After the 34th Mechanized Brigade "Vasile Lupu" was reorganized in 2004 as the Light Infantry Brigade, the White Sharks were the component battalion that maintained the highest readiness, and the only large military unit based in Dobruja.

References

Brigades of Romania